Margot Bingham is an American actress and singer-songwriter. She is best known for her role as jazz singer Daughter Maitland in the HBO period drama series, Boardwalk Empire. In 2015, Bingham began starring as one of lead characters in the ABC drama series, The Family. In 2021, she starred in the eleventh and final season of The Walking Dead.

Life and career
Bingham was born in August 1988 and raised in the Green Tree suburb of Pittsburgh, Pennsylvania, the daughter of Craig Bingham, a former Pittsburgh Steelers linebacker, and Lynne Bingham. She graduated in 2006 from the Pittsburgh High School for the Creative and Performing Arts, and attended Point Park University for two years before relocating to New York City. She began appearing on stage there in 2010, and had a role in the 2011 revival of Rent. During that same time, she co-starred in the web series In Between Men, and performed in BAM Cafe at the Brooklyn Academy of Music.

In 2013, Bingham was cast in the recurring role of the 1920s jazz singer Daughter Maitland in the HBO period drama series, Boardwalk Empire, for which she received positive reviews from critics. In 2014, she had the recurring role in the short-lived El Rey Network series, Matador. In 2015, Bingham was cast as one of the female lead characters opposite Joan Allen in the ABC drama series, The Family created by Jenna Bans.

Personal life
Bingham is of Jamaican descent on her father's side, and of German-Jewish and Russian-Jewish descent on her mother's side.  Bingham is Jewish, and had a Bat Mitzvah ceremony.

Filmography

Film

Television

References

External links
 Official Web Site for Actress and Singer Margot Bingham
 

Place of birth missing (living people)
Year of birth uncertain
21st-century American actresses
Actresses from Pittsburgh
African-American Jews
African-American women singer-songwriters
American Jews
American film actresses
American television actresses
Living people
Musicians from Pittsburgh
21st-century African-American women
21st-century African-American people
Singer-songwriters from Pennsylvania
Year of birth missing (living people)